Nemipteridae are a family of fishes within the order Perciformes. They are known as threadfin breams, whiptail breams and false snappers.

They are found in tropical waters of the Indian and western Pacific Oceans. Most species are benthic carnivores, preying on smaller fishes, cephalopods, crustaceans and polychaetes; however, a few species eat plankton.

Threadfin bream harbour parasites. A study conducted in New Caledonia has shown that the fork-tailed threadfin bream (Nemipterus furcosus) harboured 25 species of parasites, including nematodes, cestodes, digeneans, monogeneans, isopods, and copepods. None of these parasites are transmissible to humans.

References 

 
Ray-finned fish families